Bob Jerry Archuleta (born June 1, 1945) is an American politician serving in the California State Senate. He is a Democrat representing the 32nd district, encompassing parts of southeastern Los Angeles County and Orange County. Prior to being elected to the state senate, he served on the Pico Rivera City Council.

Archuleta ran for the California state Senate in 2018 in both a special election to fill the seat left vacant by the resignation of incumbent  Democrat Tony Mendoza, as well as the regularly scheduled election. Mendoza resigned to avoid a possible expulsion vote from the State Senate after being accused of years of sexual harassment of female former aides. Although he had resigned the seat, Mendoza also ran in both elections. Archuleta lost the special election Montebello Mayor Vanessa Delgado, but won the regularly scheduled election in a major upset, as Delgado had the support of much of the state Democratic Party's leadership. In 2022, Archuleta ran for reelection, in a district that has since been renumbered as the 30th district. He won the election with 61% of the vote.

External links 
 
 Campaign website
 Join California Bob Archuleta
 

Democratic Party California state senators
1945 births
Living people
People from Pico Rivera, California
21st-century American politicians
California city council members